Swedish hardcore punk band Refused had a brief but prolific seven-year run before originally disbanding in 1998. They are now back together and producing new music.

Studio albums

Studio albums

Compilation albums

EPs/MCDs
 Refused (1992, self-released) CS
 Second Demo: Operation Headfirst (1992, Umeå Hardcore Records) CS
 This Is the New Deal (1993, Burning Heart Records) CD/CS
 Pump the Brakes (1994, Startrec Records) CD/CS
 Everlasting (1994, Startrec Records, We Bite, Org Music, Equal Vision Records) CD, CS, 12"
 Refused Loves Randy (1995, Startrec Records) CD
 Rather Be Dead E.P. (1996, Startrec Records, Burning Heart Records, Epitaph) CD/12"
 The New Noise Theology E.P. (1998, Burning Heart Records, Honey Bear Records) CD/12"
 Three Songs from the Shape of Punk to Come (1998, Burning Heart, Epitaph Records) CD
 New Noise (2010, Epitaph Records) CD
 Servants of Death (2018)
 Not Fit For Broadcast (Live at the BBC) (2020, Spinefarm Records, Search and Destroy Records) 12"
 The Malignant Fire (2020, Spinefarm Records, Search and Destroy Records) 12"

DVDs
 Refused Are Fucking Dead (2006)

Compilations
Really Fast Vol.8 (1993) - LP (Really Fast)
 I Wish (Taken from This Is The New Deal)
Northcore: The Polar Scene Compilation (1994) - CD (Burning Heart)
 The New Deal (Previously Unreleased Version)
 Guilty (Previously Unreleased)
Hardcore For The Masses Vol.2 (1994) - CD (Burning Heart)
 The Real (Previously Unreleased Version)
Cheap Shots - CD (1994) (Burning Heart)
Hate Breeds Hate (Taken from This Is The New Deal)
Adrenalin (1994) - CD (Luger)
Pump The Brakes (Taken from This Just Might Be...The Truth)
Strength (Taken from This Just Might Be...The Truth)
Straight Edge As Fuck (1994) - MCD (Desperate Fight Records)
Everlasting (Previously Unreleased Version)Straight Edge As Fuck Vol.2 (1995) - CD (Desperate Fight Records)
Cheap... (Previously Unreleased)Purple Pain (1995) - CD (Dolores)
Let's Go Crazy (Previously unreleased / Written by Prince)Best Alternative (1996) - CD (Arcade)
Return To The Closet (Taken from Songs To Fan The Flames Of Discontent)
Kittenish Vol.4 (1996) - CD (Border)
Coup D'état (Taken from Songs To Fan The Flames Of Discontent)
Still from the Heart 199? - CD (We Bite)
Rather Be Dead (Taken from Songs To Fan The Flames Of Discontent)
Equal Vision Records Sampler 199? - CD (Equal Vision)
Sunflower Princess (Taken from Everlasting)
Defenders Of The Oppressed Breed 199? - CD (Veggie Music)
Jag Äter Inte Mina Vänner (Taken from Rather Be Dead E.P)
Victory Promo 02 (1996) - CD (Victory)
Coup D'état (Taken from Songs To Fan The Flames Of Discontent)
Children In Heat (1996) - CD (Hellbound Heart)
Bullet (Previously Unreleased / Written by The Misfits)
Victory Style Vol.2 (1997) - CD (Victory)
It's Not O.K... (Taken from Songs To Fan The Flames Of Discontent)
Popstad Umeå (1997) - CD (Nons)
Rather Be Dead (Taken from Songs To Fan The Flames Of Discontent)
Straight Edge As Fuck Vol.3 (1997) - CD (Desperate Fight Records)
 New Noise (Previously Unreleased Version)
100% Adrenalin (1997) - CD (MRN)
Coup d'etad (Unreleased live-version)
Cheap Shots Vol.3 (1998) - CD (Burning Heart)
Rather Be Dead (Taken from Songs To Fan The Flames Of Discontent)
The Shape Of Punk To Come (Taken from The Shape Of Punk To Come)
Sweden Deluxe (1998) - CD (Moondog)
New Noise (Taken from The Shape Of Punk To Come)
Still Screaming (1998) - CD/LP (Burning Heart)
The Deadly Rhythm (taken from The Shape Of Punk To Come)
Peek-A-Boo (Previously Unreleased)
Better Living Through Reckless Experimentation 199? - CD (Barcode)
The Deadly Rhythm (taken from The Shape Of Punk To Come)
Punk mob 199? - CD (???)
New Noise (Taken from The Shape Of Punk To Come)
Punk-O-Rama Vol.4 (1999) - CD (Epitaph)
Summerholidays Vs. Punkroutine (Taken from The Shape Of Punk To Come)
Can't Stop This Train (1999) - CD (Join The Team Player)
Nothing New Again (Previously Unreleased)
Rock 'N' Snow 199?/200? - CD (???)
New Noise (Taken from The Shape Of Punk To Come)
Metroschifter: Encapsulated (Tribute) (2001) - CD (Doghouse)
L-182 (Previously Unreleased / Written by Metroschifter)
Cheap Shots Vol.4 (2000) - CD (Burning Heart)
New Noise (Taken from The Shape Of Punk To Come)
Burning Heart Records: Smash It Up! (2000) - CD (Burning Heart)
Summerholiday vs. Punkroutine (Taken from The Shape Of Punk To Come)
For Those Who Stand (2001) - CD (Tear It Down)
The Deadly Rhythm (taken from The Shape Of Punk To Come)
Cheap Shots Vol.5 (2001) - CD (Burning Heart)
Rather Be Dead (Taken from Songs To Fan The Flames Of Discontent)
Punk-O-Rama Vol.5 (2001) - CD (Epitaph)
Refused Are Fucking Dead - Remix (Taken from The New Noise Theology E.P)
Punk-O-Rama Vol.8 (2003) - 2xCD (Epitaph)
Coup D'état (Taken from Songs To Fan The Flames Of Discontent)
Startracks (2003) - CD (Startracks)
Pump The Brakes (Taken from This Just Might Be...The Truth)
Punk-O-Rama Vol.9 (2004) - CD+DVD (Epitaph)
Liberation Frequency (Taken from The Shape Of Punk To Come)
Victory Video Sampler 199? - VHS (Victory)
Rather Be Dead (Taken from Songs To Fan The Flames Of Discontent)
Flame Still Burns (1999) - VHS (Burning Heart)
New Noise (Taken from The Shape Of Punk To Come)
Rather Be Dead (Taken from Songs To Fan The Flames Of Discontent)
Hang the VJ (2001) - DVD (Burning Heart)
New Noise (Taken from The Shape Of Punk To Come)
Rather Be Dead (Taken from Songs To Fan The Flames Of Discontent)
Pump The Brakes (Taken from This Just Might Be The Truth)
Hate Breeds Hate (Taken from This Is The New Deal)
Punk-O-Rama Vol.1 (2003) - DVD (Epitaph)
New Noise (Taken from The Shape Of Punk To Come)

Singles and music videos

"Hate Breeds Hate" (1993)
"Pump The Brakes" (1994)
"Rather Be Dead" (1996)
"New Noise" (1997)
"Elektra" (2015)
"Dawkins Christ" (2015)
"Blood Red" (2019)
"REV001" (2019)

Bootlegs
Split with Abhinanda
 Year: 1997
 Format: 7"
 Guilty
 Let's go crazy
 Spiritual game
 Revolution
Their last concert in Europe
 Recorded: 1998
 Release Year:199?-200?
 Format: CD-R
 The shape of punk to come
 The Refused party program
 Circle pit
 Hook, line and sinker
 Refused are fuckin dead
 Rather be dead
 Burn it
 The deadly rhythm
 Pretty face
 New noise
 Tannhäuser
 Derivé

References

External links
 Official website
 Discography listing

Punk rock group discographies
Discographies of Swedish artists